Vikrāntavarman II (?–741 AD), was the seventh king of the Fourth dynasty of Champa, modern-day Central Vietnam, reigned from 686 to 741. He was the son of king Vikrantavarman I. He was identified as Jianduodamo (Chinese: 建多达摩, Middle Chinese: *kɨanh-tɑ-dɑt-mɑ) in the medieval Chinese annals of the New Book of Tang. In his kośa for the lingam of Vāmeśvara in Mỹ Sơn, Vikrantavarman II is venerated as lion among kings.

An inscription on a stele dated 19 May 687 in Mỹ Sơn is attributed to his coronation. That same day he also installed a sheath and a crown for two of his beloved gods, Īśānesvara and Bhadreśvara, manifest in the earth in the form of lingas.

References

Bibliography
  
  

Kings of Champa